Sergei Vasilyevich Nechay (born 10 December 1968) is a Russian professional football official and a former player. He made his professional debut in the Soviet Second League in 1989 for PFC Nyva Vinnytsia.

Honours
 Russian Premier League runner-up: 1993.
 Russian Cup finalist: 1995.

European club competitions
 UEFA Cup 1994–95 with FC Rotor Volgograd: 2 games, 1 goal.
 UEFA Intertoto Cup 1999 with FC Rostselmash Rostov-on-Don: 1 game.

References

1968 births
Footballers from Luhansk
Living people
Soviet footballers
Russian footballers
Russian Premier League players
FC Rotor Volgograd players
FC Rostov players
FC Dynamo Stavropol players
FC Sodovik Sterlitamak players
Association football defenders
FC Taganrog players